San Martín de la Tercia is a locality and minor local entity located in the municipality of Villamanín, in León province, Castile and León, Spain. As of 2020, it has a population of 26.

Geography 
San Martín de la Tercia is located 80km north-northwest of León, Spain.

Personalities 
José Luis García Fierro (1948-2020), Researcher Professor at the Spanish National Research Council (CSIC), was born in San Martín de Tercia. Prof. Fierro received the "Miguel Catalán" award from the Regional Government of Madrid, and Honoris Causa Doctorates from the Universities of Patras (Greece), Concepción (Chile) and San Marcos (Peru).

References

Populated places in the Province of León